SFTS may refer to:

 San Francisco Theological Seminary, a graduate school affiliated with Presbyterian Church (U.S.A.) located in San Anselmo, California
 Severe fever with thrombocytopenia syndrome, an infectious disease caused by SFTS virus